Lieutenant (Lt) is a Canadian Forces rank used by commissioned officers of the Canadian Army or Royal Canadian Air Force. Sub-lieutenant is the equivalent rank in the Royal Canadian Navy. Lieutenants and sub-lieutenants are equivalent to ranks with a NATO code of OF-1.

Insignia 
The rank insignia of a lieutenant in the Canadian Army is two pips. In the Royal Canadian Air Force, the insignia is one -inch (13 mm) stripe with a -inch (6.4 mm) stripe above it. The rank insignia of a sub-lieutenant is a -inch (6.4 mm) stripe with one -inch (13 mm) stripe with the executive curl above it. On CADPAT and flying uniforms, the insignia is white on army slip-ons and dark blue on air force slip-ons.

Canadian Army

Royal Canadian Air Force

Pronunciation 
The British pronunciation of the French word "lieutenant" (as "lef-tenant") is the official pronunciation as used by the Canadian Armed Forces, but the American pronunciation of "loo-tenant" (which is closer to the original French pronunciation) is sometimes heard outside of the military.

References

Military ranks of Canada